"Fiends of the Family" is a 1969 Australian television play. It was part of the Australian Plays series. Written by Pat Flower based on her 1966 novel, directed by Oscar Whitbread.

Plot
In a lonely house in the suburbs, three middle-aged sisters are repressed by their mother.

Cast
Ruth Cracknell
Betty Lucas
Judith Fisher
Moray Powell

Production
The ABC bought the rights to the novel in November 1967.

Reception
It won the 1970 Awgie for best script.

References

External links
 
 

1960s Australian television plays
1969 Australian television episodes
1969 television plays
Australian Plays (season 1) episodes